Sassafras is a locality and small rural community in the local government areas of Latrobe and Meander Valley, in the Launceston and North-west and west regions of Tasmania. The Mersey River forms part of its western boundary, and the Bass Highway passes through from south to north-west. The 2016 census determined a population of 347 for the state suburb of Sassafras.

History
European settlement came to the Sassafras district in the 1850s. The land was covered by almost impervious scrub, and it had to be cleared before farming could begin. An interdenominational chapel was opened on the 1st of January 1865 by Henry Rockliff. It was built on his own property Skelbrook. A Wesleyan Church was opened in 1876 near there. Schooling was first conducted in a 'hut', then in the chapel. The first public school was either opened in 1871 or five years after 1865. The area during this time had a blacksmith, wheelwright, bootmaker, flour mill, butcher, post office and police station. The property of Skelbrook is still owned by the Rockliff family (as of 2018) and produces Potatoes, poppies, beans, peas, broad beans, baby carrots and wheat.

Notable Landmarks 

Kenny Kennebec, 'The Big Spud' Sassafras Baptist Church. Nichols Poultry.

Road infrastructure
Four shielded minor roads terminate at the Bass Highway in Sassafras. The C706 route (East Sassafras Road) runs east within Sassafras and then north to Harford, while the C713 route (Chapel Road) runs north from the centre to Harford.

Notable people
 Arthur Cutts, Australian politician
 George Pullen, Australian politician
 Jeremy Rockliff, Australian politician
 Thornton Rockliffe, Australian cricketer
 Michael Adye Smith, Australian politician

See also
 Atherosperma, commonly known as the southern sassafrases, are a family of broadleaf evergreen trees and shrubs of the Southern Hemisphere, including Tasmania.
 Other articles with references by K.R. von STIEGLITZ (compiler of A Short History on Latrobe with notes on Port Sorell and Sassafras)
 Carrick, Tasmania
 Exton, Tasmania
 Hagley, Tasmania
 Meander River (Tasmania)
 Michael Howe (bushranger)
 Westbury, Tasmania

References

External links
Tasmanian Food and Wine Conservatory, Sassafras
Blackheart Sassafras

Localities of Latrobe Council
Localities of Meander Valley Council
Towns in Tasmania